Ricardo Mário de Souza (born 21 September 1994) is a Brazilian track and field sprinter who competes in the 100 metres. He represented the host nation at the 2016 Rio Olympics. He holds a personal best of 10.21 seconds for the 100 m.

He emerged in 2013 with three medals at the 2013 South American Junior Championships in Athletics. He enjoyed success with the Brazilian 4 × 100 metres relay team, taking bronze at the 2013 Pan American Junior Athletics Championships, a gold at the 2014 South American Under-23 Championships in Athletics, and a silver at the 2016 Ibero-American Championships in Athletics held in Rio de Janeiro.

At the 2016 Summer Olympics he led off a team including Vitor Hugo dos Santos, Bruno de Barros, and Jorge Vides that placed sixth in the final.

Personal bests
100 metres – 10.21 (2016)
200 metres – 20.78 (2014)
400 metres – 49.41 (2015)
4 × 100 metres relay – 38.19 (2016)

All information from All-Athletics profile.

International competitions

References

External links

Living people
1994 births
Brazilian male sprinters
Olympic athletes of Brazil
Athletes (track and field) at the 2016 Summer Olympics
S.L. Benfica athletes
21st-century Brazilian people